José Antonio Andrés Guillén (born 18 January 1974 in Gandia) is a retired Spanish sprinter who specialised in the 400 metres. He represented his country at the 2000 Summer Olympics, as well as three outdoor and one indoor World Championships. He won the bronze medal with the Spanish 4 × 400 metres relay at the 1998 European Championships.

His personal bests in the event are 46.23 seconds outdoors (Monachil 1999) and 47.14 seconds indoors (Paris 1997).

Competition record

References

1974 births
Living people
Spanish male sprinters
Olympic athletes of Spain
Athletes (track and field) at the 2000 Summer Olympics
World Athletics Championships athletes for Spain
People from Gandia
Sportspeople from the Province of Valencia
Athletes (track and field) at the 1997 Mediterranean Games
Mediterranean Games competitors for Spain